Bekhzod Sodiqovich Yuldoshev (born 9 May 1945) is an Uzbek physicist who served as head of the Academy of Sciences of Uzbekistan from 2000 to 2005 and since 2017.

Early life 
Born on 9 May 1945 in Tashkent, Yuldoshev initially worked as a junior researcher at the Institute of Nuclear Physics of the Academy of Sciences of the Uzbek SSR after he graduated from Tashkent State University in 1968. After defending his thesis in 1971, he went on to work as a senior researcher at the Budker Institute of Nuclear Physics.

Career 
Having defended his thesis for his doctorate of physical and mathematical sciences in 1981, he went on to be head of a laboratory Physicotechnical Institute of the Academy of Sciences of Uzbekistan, holding that post from 1984 to 1990. In June that year, he became the director of the Institute of Nuclear Physics, where he remained until 2006. Meanwhile, he became a corresponding member of the Academy of Sciences in 1994, and then a full member in 2000. That year, he was made president of the Academy of Sciences, but he was removed from the post on 21 November 2005. Earlier that year on 24 January, he had been appointed a member of the Oliy Majlis by decree of Karimov. In 2006 he was demoted to laboratory head in the Institute of Nuclear Physics. In the course of his work, he conducted research outside Uzbekistan, becoming a visiting professor at Stanford University and the University of Washington as well as working on projects with Fermilab and TRIUMF. In addition, he worked as a consultant for the IAEA for four years. Eventually, on 10 January 2017, he was elected to be the president of the Academy of Sciences again, and in 2022 he was elected as a member of the Russian Academy of Sciences. As of 2022 he has authored over 400 papers, trained 9 doctoral students, and 30 candidates of sciences.

References 

Living people
1945 births